The Mexican Army is the combined land and air branch and is the largest part of the Mexican Armed Forces; it is also known as the National Defense Army.

The Army is under the authority of the Secretariat of National Defense or SEDENA and is headed by the Secretary of National Defence.

It was the first army to adopt (1908) and use (1910) a self-loading rifle, the Mondragón rifle. The Mexican Army has an active duty force of 198,000 with 76,000 men and women of military service age.

History

Antecedents

Pre-Columbian era: native warriors

In the prehispanic era, there were many indigenous tribes and highly developed city-states in what is now known as central Mexico. The most advanced and powerful kingdoms were those of Tenochtitlan, Texcoco and Tlacopan, which comprised populations of the same ethnic origin and were politically linked by an alliance known as the Triple Alliance; colloquially these three states are known as the Aztec. They had a center for higher education called the Calmecac in Nahuatl, this was where the children of the Aztec priesthood and nobility receive rigorous religious and military training and conveyed the highest knowledge such as: doctrines, divine songs, the science of interpreting codices, calendar skills, memorization of texts, etc. In Aztec society, it was compulsory for all young males, nobles as well as commoners, to join part of the armed forces at the age of 15. Recruited by regional and clan groups (calpulli) the conscripts were organized in units of about 8,000 men (Xiquipilli). These were broken down into 400 strong sub-units. Aztec nobility (some of whom were the children of commoners who had distinguished themselves in battle) led their own serfs on campaign.

Itzcoatl "Obsidian Serpent" (1381–1440), fourth king of Tenochtitlán, organized the army that defeated the Tepanec of Atzcapotzalco, freeing his people from their dominion. His reign began with the rise of what would become the largest empire in Mesoamerica. Then Moctezuma Ilhuicamina "The arrow to the sky" (1440–1469) came to extend the domain and the influence of the monarchy of Tenochtitlán. He began to organize trade to the outside regions of the Valley of Mexico. This was the Mexica ruler who organized the alliance with the lordships of Texcoco and Tlacopan to form the Triple Alliance.

The Aztec established the Flower Wars as a form of worship; these, unlike the wars of conquest, were aimed at obtaining prisoners for sacrifice to the sun. Combat orders were given by kings (or Lords) using drums or blowing into a sea snail shell that gave off a sound like a horn. Giving out signals using coats of arms was very common. For combat outside of cities, they would organize several groups, only one of which would be involved in action, while the others remained on the alert. When attacking enemy cities, they usually divided their forces into three equal-sized wings, which simultaneously assaulted different parts of the defences – this enabled the leaders to determine which division of warriors had distinguished themselves the most in combat.

Military in the Spanish Colonial Era

During the 18th century the Spanish colonial forces in the greater Mexico region consisted of regular "Peninsular" regiments sent from Spain itself, augmented by locally recruited provincial and urban militia units of infantry, cavalry and artillery. A few regular infantry and dragoon regiments (e.g. the Regimiento de Mexico) were recruited within Mexico and permanently stationed there. Mounted units of soldados de cuera (so called from the leather protective clothing that they wore) patrolled frontier and desert regions.

Independence

In the early morning of 16 September 1810, the Army of Miguel Hidalgo y Costilla initiated the independence movement. Hidalgo was followed by his loyal companions, among them Mariano Abasolo, and a small army equipped with swords, spears, slingshots and sticks. Captain General Ignacio Allende was the military brains of the insurgent army in the first phase of the War of Independence and secured several victories over the Spanish Royal Army. Their troops were about 5,000 strong and were later joined by squadrons of the Queen's Regiment where its members in turn contributed infantry battalions and cavalry squadrons to the insurrection cause.

The Spaniards saw that it was important to defend the Alhóndiga de Granaditas public granary in Guanajuato, which maintained the flow of water, weapons, food and ammunition to the Spanish Royal Army. The insurgents entered Guanajuato and proceeded to lay siege to the Alhóndiga. The insurgents suffered heavy casualties until Juan Jose de los Reyes, the Pípila, fitted a slab of rock on his back to protect himself from enemy fire and crawled to the large wooden door of the Alhóndiga with a torch in hand to set it on fire. With this stunt, the insurgents managed to bring down the door and enter the building and overrun it. Hidalgo headed to Valladolid (now Morelia), which was captured with little opposition. While the Insurgent Army was, by then, over 60,000 strong, it was mostly formed of poorly armed men with arrows, sticks and tillage tools – it had a few guns, which had been taken from Spanish stocks.

In Aculco, the Royal Spanish forces under the command of Felix Maria Calleja, Count of Calderón, and Don Manuel de Flon (and comprising 200 infantrymen, 500 cavalry and 12 cannons) defeated the insurgents, who lost many men as well as the artillery they had obtained at Battle of Monte de las Cruces. On 29 November 1810, Hidalgo entered Guadalajara, the capital of Nueva Galicia, where he organized his government and the Insurgent Army; he also issued a decree abolishing slavery.

At Calderon Bridge (Puente de Calderón) near the city of Guadalajara Jalisco, insurgents held a hard-fought battle with the royalists. During the fierce fighting, one of the insurgents' ammunition wagons exploded, which led to their defeat. The insurgents lost all their artillery, much of their equipment and the lives of many men.

At the Wells of Baján (Norias de Baján) near Monclova, Coahuila, a former royalist named Ignacio Elizondo, who had joined the insurgent cause, betrayed them and seized Miguel Hidalgo y Costilla, Ignacio Allende, Juan Aldama, José Mariano Jiménez and the rest of the entourage. They were brought to the city of Chihuahua where they were tried by a military court and executed by firing squad on 30 July 1811. Hidalgo's death resulted in a political vacuum for the insurgents until 1812. Meanwhile, the royalist military commander, General Félix María Calleja, continued to pursue rebel troops. The fighting evolved into guerrilla warfare.

The next major rebel leader was the priest José María Morelos y Pavón, who had formerly led the insurgent movement alongside Hidalgo. Morelos fortified the port of Acapulco and took the city of Chilpancingo. Along the way, Morelos, was joined by Leonardo Bravo, his son Nicholas and his brothers Max, Victor and Miguel Bravo.

Morelos conducted several campaigns in the south, managing to conquer much of the region as he gave orders to the insurgents to promote the writing of the first constitution for the new Mexican nation: the Constitution of Apatzingan, which was drafted in 1814. In 1815, Morelos was apprehended and executed by firing squad. His death concluded the second phase of the Mexican War for Independence. From 1815 to 1820, the independence movement became sluggish; it was briefly reinvigorated by Francisco Javier Mina and Pedro Moreno, who were both quickly apprehended and executed.

It was not until late 1820, when Agustín de Iturbide, one of the most bloodthirsty enemies of the insurgents, established relations with Vicente Guerrero and Guadalupe Victoria, two of the rebel leaders. Guerrero and Victoria supported Iturbide's plan for Mexican independence, El Plan de Iguala and Iturbide was appointed commander of the Ejército Trigarante, or The Army of the Three Guarantees. With this new alliance, they were able to enter Mexico City on 27 September 1821, which concluded the Mexican War for Independence.

Pastry War

The Pastry War was the first French intervention in Mexico. Following the widespread civil disorder that plagued the early years of the Mexican republic, fighting in the streets destroyed a great deal of personal property. Foreigners whose property was damaged or destroyed by rioters or bandits were usually unable to obtain compensation from the government, and began to appeal to their own governments for help.

In 1838, a French pastry cook, Monsieur Remontel, claimed that his shop in the Tacubaya district of Mexico City had been ruined in 1828 by looting Mexican officers. He appealed to France's King Louis-Philippe (1773–1850). Coming to its citizen's aid, France demanded 600,000 pesos in damages. This amount was extremely high when compared to an average workman's daily pay, which was about one peso. In addition to this amount, Mexico had defaulted on millions of dollars worth of loans from France. Diplomat Baron Deffaudis gave Mexico an ultimatum to pay, or the French would demand satisfaction. When the payment was not forthcoming from president Anastasio Bustamante (1780–1853), the king sent a fleet under Rear Admiral Charles Baudin to declare a blockade of all Mexican ports from Yucatán to the Rio Grande, to bombard the Mexican fortress of San Juan de Ulúa, and to seize the port of Veracruz. Virtually the entire Mexican Navy was captured at Veracruz by December 1838. Mexico declared war on France.

With trade cut off, the Mexicans began smuggling imports into Corpus Christi, Texas, and then into Mexico. Fearing that France would blockade Texan ports as well, a battalion of men of the Republic of Texas force began patrolling Corpus Christi Bay to stop Mexican smugglers. One smuggling party abandoned their cargo of about a hundred barrels of flour on the beach at the mouth of the bay, thus giving Flour Bluff its name. The United States, ever watchful of its relations with Mexico, sent the schooner Woodbury to help the French in their blockade. Talks between the French Kingdom and the Texan nation occurred and France agreed not to offend the soil or waters of the Republic of Texas. With the diplomatic intervention of the United Kingdom, eventually President Bustamante promised to pay the 600,000 pesos and the French forces withdrew on 9 March 1839.

U.S. invasion

U.S. territorial expansion under Manifest Destiny in the 19th century had reached the banks of the Rio Grande, which prompted Mexican president José Joaquín de Herrera to form an army of 6,000 men to defend the Mexican northern frontier from the expansion of the neighboring country. In 1845, Texas, a former Mexican territory that had broken away from Mexico by rebellion, was annexed into the United States. In response to this, the minister of Mexico in the U.S., Juan N. Almonte called for his Letters of Recognition and returned to Mexico; hostilities promptly ensued. On 25 April 1846, a Mexican force under colonel Anastasio Torrejon surprised and defeated a U.S. squadron at the Rancho de Carricitos in Matamoros in an event that would latter be known as the Thornton Skirmish; this was the pretext that U.S. president James K. Polk used to persuade the U.S. congress into declaring a state of war against Mexico on 13 May 1846. U.S. Army captain John C. Frémont, with about sixty well-armed men, had entered the California territory in December 1845 before the war had been official and was marching slowly to Oregon when he received word that war between Mexico and the U.S. was imminent; thus began a chapter of the war known as the Bear Flag Revolt.

On 20 September 1846, the U.S. launched an attack on Monterrey, which fell after 5 days. After this U.S. victory, hostilities were suspended for 7 weeks, allowing Mexican troops to leave the city with their flags displayed in full honors as U.S. soldiers regrouped and regained their losses. In August 1846, Commodore David Conner and his squadron of ships were in Veracruzian waters; he tried, unsuccessfully, to seize the Fort of Alvarado, which was defended by the Mexican Navy. The Americans were forced to relocate to Antón Lizardo. In confronting resistance and fortifications at the port of Veracruz, the U.S. Army and Marines implemented an intense bombardment of the city from 22–26 March 1847, causing about five hundred civilian deaths and significant damage to homes, buildings, and merchandise. General Winfield Scott and Commodore Matthew C. Perry capitalized on this civilian suffering: by refusing to allow the consulates of Spain and France to assist in civilian evacuation, they pressed Mexican Gen. Juan Morales to negotiate surrender.

U.S. commodore Matthew C. Perry, who had already captured the town of Frontera, in Tabasco, tried to seize San Juan Bautista (modern Villahermosa), but he was repelled three times by a Mexican garrison of just under three hundred men. U.S. troops were also sent to the California territories with the intention of seizing it. After squads of U.S. troops occupied the City of Los Angeles, Mexican authorities were forced to move to Sonora; but, by the end of September 1846, commander José María Flores was able to gather 500 Mexicans and managed to defeat the U.S. garrison at Los Angeles and then sent detachments to Santa Barbara and San Diego.

After putting up a fierce defense against the U.S. invasion, the Mexican positions along the state of Chihuahua began to fall. These forces had been organized by general José Antonio de Heredia and governor Ángel Trías Álvarez. The cavalry of the latter made several desperate charges against the U.S. that nearly achieved victory, but his inexperience in fighting was evident and, in the end, all the positions gained were lost.

French Intervention

The French intervention was an invasion by an expeditionary force sent by the Second French Empire, supported in the beginning by the United Kingdom and the Kingdom of Spain. It followed President Benito Juárez's suspension of interest payments to foreign countries on 17 July 1861, which angered Mexico's major creditors: Spain, France and Britain.

Napoleon III of France was the instigator: His foreign policy was based on a commitment to free trade. For him, a friendly government in Mexico provided an opportunity to expand free trade by ensuring European access to important markets, and preventing monopoly by the United States. Napoleon also needed the silver that could be mined in Mexico to finance his empire. Napoleon built a coalition with Spain and Britain at a time the U.S. was engaged in a full-scale civil war. The U.S. protested, but could not intervene directly until its civil war was over in 1865.

The three powers signed the Treaty of London on 31 October, to unite their efforts to receive payments from Mexico. On 8 December, the Spanish fleet and troops from Spanish-controlled Cuba arrived at Mexico's main Gulf port, Veracruz. When the British and Spanish discovered that the French planned to invade Mexico, they withdrew.

The subsequent French invasion resulted in the Second Mexican Empire, which was supported by the Roman Catholic clergy, many conservative elements of the upper class, and some indigenous communities. The presidential terms of Benito Juárez (1858–71) were interrupted by the rule of the Habsburg monarchy in Mexico (1864–67). Conservatives, and many in the Mexican nobility, tried to revive the monarchical form of government (see: First Mexican Empire) when they helped to bring to Mexico an archduke from the Royal House of Austria, Maximilian Ferdinand, or Maximilian I of Mexico (who married Charlotte of Belgium, also known as Carlota of Mexico), with the military support of France. France had various interests in this Mexican affair, such as seeking reconciliation with Austria, which had been defeated during the Franco-Austrian War, counterbalancing the growing U.S. power by developing a powerful Catholic neighbouring empire, and exploiting the rich mines in the north-west of the country.

Mexican Republican forces

In 1861, the Mexican Republican Army consisted of ten regular line battalions each of eight companies, and six line cavalry regiments, each of two squadrons. With six batteries of field artillery plus engineers, train and garrison units, the regular army numbered about 12,000 men. Auxiliary forces, comprising state militias and National Guards, provided a further 25 infantry battalions and 25 cavalry squadrons plus some garrison and artillery units. The National Guard of the Federal District of Mexico City amounted to six infantry battalions plus one each of cavalry and artillery. The newly raised corps of Rurales, created on 5 May 1861 as a mounted gendarmerie, numbered 2,200 and served as dispersed units of light cavalry against the French.

While opposed by substantial forces of French regular troops plus Mexican Imperial forces and contingents of foreign volunteers, the Republican Army remained in being as an effective force after the fall of Mexico City in 1863. By 1865 Liberal opposition was being led by a core of 50,000 regular Mexican troops and state National Guards, augmented by approximately 10,000 guerrillas.

Díaz era

Following the French withdrawal and the overthrow of the Imperial regime of Maximilian, the Mexican Republic was re-established in 1867. In 1876, Porfirio Diaz, a leading general of the anti-Maximilianist forces, became president. He was to retain power until 1910, with only one short break. During the early part of this period of extended rule, Diaz relied essentially on military power to remain in office. However he was able to develop other support bases and the army became a reliable non-political instrument for maintaining internal order.

Diaz undertook a series of reforms intended to modernize the Mexican Army, while at the same time terminating the historic pattern of local commanders attempting to seize power using irregulars or provincial forces. The increasingly elderly generals of the Federal Army were frequently transferred and kept loyal through opportunities for graft. By the early 1900s the large officer corps was benefiting from professional training along Prussian Army lines and improved career opportunities for cadets of middle-class origin. Finally, an efficient mounted police force of rurales took over responsibility for public order, and the army itself was reduced in size by about a third.

A continuing weakness in the Mexican Army throughout the Diaz period was the low morale and motivation of the rank-and-file. They mostly consisted of Indian and mestizo conscripts, forced into service under the random leva system. Some were enlisted as a means of punishment or because of social discrimination, and a number of future revolutionary leaders received their initial military experience in the ranks of the Federal Army.

By 1910, the army numbered about 25,000 men, largely conscripts of Indian origin officered by 4,000 white middle-class officers. While generally well equipped, the Federal Army under Diaz was too small in numbers to offer effective opposition to the revolutionary forces led by Francisco Madero. During the long period of Porfirian stability, increased reliance had been placed on the new railway network to quickly move small numbers of troops to suppress regional unrest. When faced with widespread revolution during 1910-11 the railway lines proved too vulnerable, regular army strength too limited and state militias too disorganised to control the situation.

Mexican Revolution 1910–1920

The ouster of Porfirio Díaz saw Francisco I. Madero: a member of a rich landowning family, elected as President of Mexico. Madero kept the Federal Army intact, despite the fact that it had been outmaneuvered by the revolutionary forces that brought him to power. General Victoriano Huerta overthrew Madero in a bloody February 1913 coup. Forces opposed to the Huerta regime united against him, particularly the Constitutionalists in the north. These were led by a civilian, Venustiano Carranza as "First Chief," commanding forces led by a number of generals, but most prominently Alvaro Obregón and Pancho Villa.  In the Morelos region, an intense guerrilla warfare was waged by forces led by Emiliano Zapata. The Federal Army supporting Huerta was defeated at the Battle of Zacatecas and finally disbanded in 1914 and a new Government army was created from Obregón's Constitutionalist forces. Zapata was assassinated in 1919; Villa was bought off and took up civilian life in northern Mexico, before being assassinated in 1923. During the post-military phase following 1920, a number of Constitutionalist leaders became presidents of Mexico: Alvaro Obregón (1920–1924), Plutarco Elías Calles (1924–28), Lázaro Cárdenas (1934–1940), and Manuel Avila Camacho (1940–1946). When Lázaro Cárdenas reorganized the political party founded by Plutarco Elías Calles, he created sectoral representation of groups in Mexico, one of which was the Mexican Army. In the subsequent reorganization of the party, which took place in 1946, the Institutional Revolutionary Party no longer had a separate sector for the army. No military man has been president of Mexico after 1946.

Contemporary era

Post-revolutionary period

The ending of the Diaz regime saw a resurgence of numerous local forces led by revolutionary generals. In 1920, more than 80,000 Mexicans were under arms, with only a minority forming part of regular forces obedient to a central authority. During the 1920s, the new government demobilised the revolutionary bands, reopened the Colegio Militar (Military Academy), established the Escuela Superior de Guerra (Staff College), and raised the salaries and improved the conditions of service of the rank and file of the regular army. In spite of an abortive generals' revolt in 1927, the result was a professional army obedient to the central government.

During this period the army was reduced in numbers through the disbandment of twenty mounted cavalry regiments, ten infantry battalions and the majority of the specialist railroad units previously required. In 1937 a process of accelerated modernisation began with the creation of companies of light tanks, mechanised infantry and motorised anti-aircraft batteries.

During the 1930s, the political role of the officer corps was reduced by the governing Revolutionary Party and a workers' militia was established, outnumbering the regular army by two to one. By the end of World War II, the Mexican Army had become a strictly professional force focused on national defense rather than political involvement.

Mexican Drug War

Although violence between drug cartels has been occurring long before the war began, the government held a generally passive stance regarding cartel violence during the 1990s and the early years of the 21st century. That changed on 11 December 2006, when newly elected President Felipe Calderón sent 6,500 federal troops to the state of Michoacán to end drug violence there. This action is regarded as the first major retaliation made against the cartel violence, and is generally viewed as the starting point of the war between the government and the drug cartels. As time progressed, Calderón continued to escalate his anti-drug campaign, in which there are now about 45,000 troops involved along with state and federal police forces.

In recent times, the Mexican military has largely participated in efforts against drug trafficking. The Operaciones contra el narcotrafico (Operations against drug trafficking), for example, describes its purpose in regards to "the performance of the Mexican Army and Air Force in the permanent campaign against the drug trafficking is sustained properly in the duties that the Executive of the Nation grants to the armed forces", for according to Article 89, Section VI of the Constitution of the Mexican United States, it is the duty of the President of the Republic of the United Mexican States, as Supreme Commander of the Armed Forces, to ensure that the Mexican Armed Forces perform its mandate of national security within and outside the state borders.

Structure

The Army is under the authority of the National Defense Secretariat or SEDENA and is headed by the Secretary of National Defence - simultaneously a member of the central government and (the sole) four-star general. His counterpart is the Secretary of the Navy, who is a member of the central government and the sole four-star admiral.

The National Defence Secretariat has three components: a national headquarters, territorial commands, and independent units. The Secretary of National Defence delegates overall command of the Army thru the office of Commander of the Army, a divisional general-ranked officer, who leads the service via a centralized command system and many general officers and is appointed and relieved by the Secretary. The Army uses a modified continental staff system in its headquarters. The Mexican Air Force is a separate service under the SEDENA. Recruitment of personnel happens from ages 18 through 21 if secondary education was finished, 22 if High school was completed. Recruitment after age 22 is impossible in the regular army; only auxiliary posts are available. As of 2009, starting salary for Mexican army recruits was $6,000 Mexican pesos (US$500) a month with a lifetime $10,000 peso (approximately US$833) monthly pension for widows of soldiers killed in action.

The principal units of the Mexican army are ten infantry brigades and a number of independent regiments and infantry battalions. The main maneuver elements of the army are organized in three corps, each consisting of three to four infantry brigades (plus other units), all based in and around Mexico City and its metropolitan area. Distinct from the brigade formations, independent regiments and battalions are assigned to zonal garrisons (52 in total) in each of the country's 12 military regions. Infantry battalions, composed of approximately 300–350 troops, generally are deployed in each zone, and certain zones are assigned an additional motorized cavalry regiment or an artillery regiment.

Regional command

The territorial organization of the Mexican Army includes twelve Military Regions (Regiónes militares (RM)). Each RM is commanded by a senior officer in the rank of Divisional General of the General Staff (General de División Diplomado de Estado Mayor), a three-star general. Below the military regions are forty-eight Military Zones (Zónas militares (ZM)). Each ZM is commanded by a senior officer in the rank of Brigade General of the General Staff (General de Brigada Diplomado de Estado Mayor), a two-star general. Operational needs determine how many zones are in each region, with corresponding increases and decreases in troop strength. Each commander of the Military Region is appointed and relieved by the Commander of the Army.

Usually on the secretary of defence's recommendation, the senior zone commander is also the commander of the military region containing the military zone. A military zone commander has jurisdiction over every unit operating in his territory, including the Rurales (Rural Defense Force) that occasionally have been a Federal political counterweight to the power of state governors. Zone commanders provide the national defence secretary with socio-political conditions intelligence about rural areas. Moreover, they traditionally have acted in co-ordination with the Secretariat of National Defense (SEDENA) on planning and resources deployment.

The commanding officer of a military zone has as at the least an independent infantry battalion under his jurisdiction, but also takes operational control of units deployed to his MZ area of responsibility. Force strength varies greatly from a single infantry battalion in the 3rd Military Zone covering the relatively peaceful area of Baja California Sur to over 10 infantry battalions, separate infantry companies and motorized cavalry regiments plus additional conventional and SF units on rotation in the 9th Military Zone covering the state of Sinaloa, where government troops are fighting the eponymous drug cartel. The Mexican Air Force, which is an independent military service under the SEDENA, has its own territorial organization, separate from that of the Mexican Army. It has four air force regions: Northwest (Región Aérea del Noroeste, HQ in Hermosillo, Sonora), Northeast (Región Aérea del Noreste, HQ in Chihuahua, Chihuahua) Central (Región Aérea del Centro, HQ at Santa Lucía AFB, Estado de México) and the Southeast Air Force Region (Región Aérea del Sureste, HQ at Tuxtla Gutiérrez, Chiapas). Each new commanding officer of an air force region enters the appointment as a Wing General Pilot-Aviator of the Air Force Staff (General de Ala Piloto Aviador Diplomado de Estado Mayor Aéreo) - a two-star general and midway through his term he is promoted to a Division General Pilot-Aviator of the Air Force Staff (General de División Piloto Aviador Diplomado de Estado Mayor Aéreo) - a three-star general. A similar territorial organization is also implemented in the Mexican Navy with Naval Regions and Naval Zones as counterparts to the army territorial organization.

Tactical units

Separate from the military regions and zones are an increasing number of brigades and some independent regiments and infantry battalions. These brigades are grouped into four corps:

 1st Army Corps (1er Cuerpo de Ejército (ICE)) - based in and around Mexico City and its metropolitan area. The corps consists of the 1st Armored Brigade, the 1st, 2nd and 3rd Separate Infantry Brigades and the army's sole 1st Combat Engineer Brigade. Additionally 3 armored brigades (2nd, 3rd and 4th) and 3 light infantry brigades (4th, 5th and 6th) separate from the 1st Army Corps, but based in the same area close to the capital complete the Mexican Army's maneuver formations.
 Special Forces Corps (Cuerpo de Fuerzas Especiales) - HQ, training center and the bulk of special forces battalions are based in Temamatla in the State of Mexico. The corps has 3 SF brigades headquartered in Puebla, Puebla (1st), Tijuana, Baja California (2nd) and Ixtepec, Oaxaca (3rd) and the SF battalions are re-assigned between them as per operational requirements.
 Military Police Corps (Cuerpo de Policía Militar) - the corps has previously been used to augment the internal security initiatives of the government in the combat against the drug cartels and military police brigades as well as individual personnel have been transferred in the past to the newly formed (and consequently defunct Federal Police, supplemented by its Gendarmerie Division, also defunct). New MP brigades were later formed to make up for the ones that were transferred. The administration of President Enrique Peña Nieto set the ambitious plan for the expansion of the Military Police from 3 to 12 MP brigades - one for each military region. By the end of his term there were ten active military police brigades:
 1st Military Police Brigade (1/a. Brigada de Policía Militar) - Campo Militar 1-A, Mexico City
 2nd Military Police Brigade (2/a. Brigada de Policía Militar) - Air Base Nr. 1 - Santa Lucía, Tecámac, State of México
 3/a. Brigada de Policía Militar - El Sauz, Sinaloa
 4/a. Brigada de Policía Militar - General Escobedo, Nuevo León
 5/a. Brigada de Policía Militar - San Miguel de los Jagüeyes, State of México
 6/a. Brigada de Policía Militar - Puebla, Puebla
 7/a. Brigada de Policía Militar - Tuxtla Gutiérrez, Chiapas
 10/a. Brigada de Policía Militar - Isla Mujeres Quintana Roo
 11/a. Brigada de Policía Militar - San Pedro de las Colonias Coahuila
 12/a. Brigada de Policía Militar - Irapuato, Guanajuato
Each MP brigade has three line military police battalions (sing.: Batallón de Policía Militar) and one special operations military police battalion (Batallón de Operaciones Especiales de Policía Militar, equipped with Plasan Sand Cat tactical armored cars) plus support units. Special Operations MP Bns carry the number of their parent brigade, line MP Bns are numbered in sequence, starting from 1st, 2nd and 3rd in the 1st MP Brigade, 4th, 5th and 6th in the 2nd MP Bde etc. up to 34th, 35th and 36th in the 12th Military Police Brigade, with battalion numbers 22nd - 27th retained for the non-active 8th and 9th MP Brigades. The MPC's involvement in the internal security policies is also present with the Federal Police's successor agency - the National Guard. In 2020 the NG had a strength of ca. 80 000 personnel. and in 2021 this number has increased to 102 000 with a goal set at 150 000. This rapid increase capitalizes heavily on the resources of the military. According to the Mexican Instituto Nacional de Transparencia 31 431 former Army and 6 337 former Navy military police personnel joined the National Guard. Its 8 training centers (Centros de Adiestramiento) are located in and rely on the resources of the army military police installations: two (one main and one NCO) training centers are located at the Campo Militar 37-C in San Miguel de los Jagüeyes, Municipality of Huehuetoca, State of México at the base of the 5th Military Police Brigade. The other six training centers are located at the military police bases in Sauz, Sinaloa (3rd MP Bde), San Pedro de las Colonias, Coahuila (11th MP Bde), Apodaca, Nuevo León (4th MP Bde), Puebla (6th MP Bde), Irapuato (12th MP Bde) and Isla Mujeres (10th MP Bde). The main reasoning behind the formation of the National Guard was to reduce the involvement of the military in the Mexican drug war, but the implementation has negated that to a great extend with the NG relying heavily on the military for staffing, training, basing and operational control. On the latter point the NG's units are called Battalions Type B (sing.: Batallón Tipo B) to distinguish them from the 'regular' infantry and MP battalions of the Mexican Army, all 85 Battalions Type B are based in army bases and are assigned to the 12 military regions of the Army.
 Presidential Guard Corps (Cuerpo de Guardias Presidenciales) - the special department of the President's Office, the Estado Mayor Presidencial used to command the Army, Air Force and Navy assets tasked with the security, land and air transport and the logistical requirements of the Office. As one of his first political initiatives upon entering the Presidency Andrés Manuel López Obrador has put to vote in the Mexican Senate the disbanding of the EMP. The vote passed and the department was dismantled at the end of 2018. At that time it included 6 026 servicemen and women from the three armed services, organised into:
 Staff (Estado Mayor)
 Presidential Guard Corps (Cuerpo de Guardias Presidenciales)
 Headquarters (Cuartel General)
 6 presidential guard battalions (1/er. - 6/o. Batallón de Guardias Presidenciales)
 1st Transport Battalion (1/er. Batallón de Transportes)
 1st Supply Company (1/a. Compañía de Intendencia)
 24th Presidential Guard Marine Infantry Battalion (24/o. Batallón de Infantería de Marina de Guardias Presidenciales) - as the single Department of the Navy asset in the EMP and infantry-oriented, the 24/o. BIMGP was attached to the CGP.
 1st Mounted Cavalry Group (1.er Grupo de Caballería Montado)
 Honor Guard Cavalry Squadron (Escuadrón de Caballería de Honores)
 Horse Artillery Battery (Batería Hipómovil)
 1st Combat Engineer Company (1/a. Compañía de Ingenieros de Combate)
 Honor Guard Artillery Battery (Batería de Artillería de Honores)
 Music Band(Banda de Música)
 General Coordination Department of the Presidential Transport Aircraft (Coordinación General de Transportes Aéreos Presidenciales) (a staff department, part of the Staff mentioned above)
 Presidential Transport Air Group (Grupo Aéreo de Transportes Presidenciales) (since the disbanding of the EMP the Coordinación General has been closed down too and the GATP became the 6th Air Group of the Mexican Air Force)
After the closure of the EMP the servicemen and women have lost their special status of personnel distinct from the three services and were integrated back into the Army, Air Force and Navy. Government plans call for the transformation of the Presidential Guard Corps into two military police brigades.

Distinct from the brigade formations are independent regiments (all regiments are battalion-sized) and battalions''' assigned to zonal garrisons. Groups are company-sized units. The different types of units of the Mexican Army follow a sequential listing starting from 1. onwards. They include the following:

 110 infantry battalions (sing.: Batallón de infantería) (with more being planned for activation. 110 is the total quantity of infantry battalions assigned to military zones and assigned to brigades)
 24 separate infantry companies (sing.: Compañía de infantería no encuadrada)
 3 parachute rifle battalions (sing.: Batallón de fusileros paracaidistas - 1st Batallón is part of the Army, 2nd and 3rd formally belong to the Air Force)
 25 motorized cavalry regiments (sing.: Regimiento de caballería motorizado)
 9 armored reconnaissance regiments (sing.: Regimiento blindado de reconocimiento)
 8 mechanized regiments (sing.: Regimiento mecanizado)
 9 artillery regiments (sing.: Regimiento de artillería)
 8 mortar group of caliber 81-mm (sing.: Grupo de morteros de calibre 81-mm)
 6 recoil-less rifle groups of caliber 106-mm (sing.: Grupo de cañones sin retroceso de calibre 106-mm)
? combat engineer battalions (sing.: Batallón de ingenieros de combate) (sources, which have reported previously small numbers of the quantity of combat engineer battalions in the Mexican Army are outdated, as official statements by the government report 8 combat engineer battalions deployed from the Mexican Army and Air Force deployed to the states of Baja California Sur, Chiapas, Ciudad de México, Estado de México, Guerrero, Jalisco,  Veracruz and Yucatán in the summer of 2021 to deal with the aftermath of torrential rains and hurricanes.)

Infantry battalions are small, each of approximately 400 troops, and are generally deployed in each zone. Certain zones are also assigned a light armored cavalry regiment, mechanized infantry regiment or one of the 24 field artillery regiments and 10 field artillery battalions. Smaller detachments are often detailed to patrol more inaccessible areas of the countryside, helping to maintain order and resolve disputes.

Other than the Special Forces and the Military Police Brigades, the Mexican Army includes the following combat brigades:
 armored - four Armored Brigades (sing.: Brigada blindada), each composed of two armored reconnaissance regiments, two mechanized regiments and smaller support units. A ninth armored reconnaissance regiment under the Army HQ functions as the training unit.
 1st Armored Brigade (1/a. Brigada Blindada - Temamatla (Teotihuacán), State of Mexico (brigade patch shows the formation belongs to the 1st Army Corps (1/er. Cuerpo de ejército - ICE))
 2nd Armored Brigade (2/a. Brigada Blindada) - Querétaro City, Querétaro (directly subordinated to Army HQ)
 3rd Armored Brigade (3/a. Brigada Blindada) - Puebla (city), Puebla (directly subordinated to Army HQ)
 4th Armored Brigade (4/a. Brigada Blindada) - Villagrán (Sarabia), Guanajuato (directly subordinated to Army HQ)
 infantry - three separate infantry brigades under 1st Army Corps and three light infantry brigades directly under army HQ. Each brigade has three infantry battalions. The light brigades lack the organic artillery and engineer units of the separate brigades.
 1st Separate Infantry Brigade (1/a. Brigada de Infantería Independiente) - Colonia Santa Teresa, State of Mexico
 2nd Separate Infantry Brigade (2/a. Brigada de Infantería Independiente) - Campo Militar No.1 - Mexico City
 3rd Separate Infantry Brigade (3/a. Brigada de Infantería Independiente) - Campo Militar No.1 - Mexico City
 4th Light Infantry Brigade (4/a. Brigada de Infantería Ligera) - Irapuato, Guanajuato
 5th Light Infantry Brigade (5/a. Brigada de Infantería Ligera) - Ixcotel, Oaxaca
 6th Light Infantry Brigade (6/a. Brigada de Infantería Ligera) - Campo Militar No.1 - Mexico City
 airborne
 Parachute Rifle Brigade (Brigada de Fusileros Paracaidistas) - Campo Militar No.1 - Mexico City (directly subordinated to Army HQ)
 engineers
 1st Combat Engineer Brigade (1/a. Brigada de Ingenieros de Combate) - Campo Militar No.1 - Mexico City (subordinated to the 1st Army Corps)

Special Forces Corps
The Army has a Special Forces Corps unified command with 3 Special Forces Brigades, a High Command GAFE group, a GAFE group assigned to the Airborne Brigade, 74 independent Special Forces Battalions and 36 Amphibious Special Forces Groups.

The Special Forces Brigades consist of nine SF battalions. The 1st Brigade has the 1st, 2nd and 3rd Battalions; the 2nd Brigade has the 5th, 6th, 7th and 8th Battalions; and the 3rd Brigade has the 4th and 9th Battalions and a Rapid Intervention Force group.

The High Command GAFE is a group with no more than 100 members and is specially trained in counter-terrorist tactics. They receive orders directly from the President of Mexico.

The Amphibious Special Forces Groups are trained in amphibious warfare, they give the army extended abilities in riverline and coastal operations in peacetime and in war.

Special Operations Forces

Estado Mayor Presidencial

The Estado Mayor Presidencial (Presidential Guard) was a specific agency of the Mexican Army that is responsible for the safety and well being of the President in the practice of all of the activities of his office. On 24 March 1985 President Miguel de la Madrid Hurtado reformed the regulation of the presidential guard and published it in the Official Gazette of the Federation (Diario Oficial de la Federación) on 4 April 1986. In this version the responsibilities of this agency included assisting the President in obtaining general information, planning the President's activities under security and preventive measures for his safety. This regulation was in force during the administrations of Carlos Salinas de Gortari and Ernesto Zedillo Ponce de Leon. On 16 January 2004 during the administration of President Vicente Fox Quesada a new regulation of the Presidential Guard was issued and published by the Official Gazette of the Federation on 23 January of that same year. This ordinance updated the structure, organization and operation of the Presidential guard as a technical military body and administrative unit of the Presidency to facilitate the implementation of the powers of his office.

The EMP was dissolved in 2018 and its military arm, the Presidential Guards Corps, has had its command becoming a joint service formation, with its units coming under the collective responsibility of the Secretariats of National Defense, Security, and the Navy, its three Army infantry battalions now converted into military police battalions as part of now two military police brigades under the revived National Guard.

Paratrooper Corps
Brigada de Fusileros Paracaidistas (Parachute Rifle Brigade) is a three-battalion paratrooper unit created in 1969 within the Mexican Army but utilizing aircraft from the Air Force. Its headquarters is in Mexico City and its training takes place in the Centro de Adiestramiento de Paracaidismo (Airborne Training Center). A battalion can be deployed rapidly to any part of the country.

Ranks

Commissioned officer ranks
The rank insignia of commissioned officers.

Other ranks
The rank insignia of non-commissioned officers and enlisted personnel.

Military industry

Since the start of the 21st century, the Army has been steadily modernising to become competitive with the armies of other American countries and have also taken certain steps to decrease spending and dependency on foreign equipment in order to become more autonomous such as the domestic production of the FX-05 rifle designed in Mexico and the commitment to researching, designing and manufacturing domestic military systems such as military electronics and body armor.

The Mexican military counts on three of the following departments to fulfill the general tasks of the Army and Air Force:Dirección General de Industria Militar (D.G.I.M.) – In charge of the designing, manufacturing and maintenance of vehicles and weapons, such as the assembly of the FX-05 assault rifle and the DN series armored vehicles. On 19 July 2009, SEDENA spent 488 million pesos ($37 million U.S.) to transfer technology to manufacture the G36V German made rifle. Although it is not known if this will be manufactured as a cheaper alternative to the FX-05 meant for the army or if it is to be manufactured for military police and other law enforcement agencies such as the Federal Police. The FX-05 is planned to become the new standard rifle for the armed forces replacing the Heckler & Koch G3, so it is not yet clear what the G-36 rifles will be used for. As of 2011, D.G.I.M. is in charge of assembling the Oshkosh SandCat, the modified Mexican Army version of the Sandcat is named as the DN-XI and will be presented in the Mexican Independence Day parade in September 2012.Dirección General de Fábricas de Vestuario y Equipo (D.G.FA.V.E.) (General Directorate of Clothing and Equipment Manufacturing) – Since its creation, the department has grown from a simple clothing factory to an Industrial complex in charge of the supply and design of the Army/Air Force's uniform, shoes/boots, combat helmet and ballistic vest. Until the mid-2000s, the Mexican army's standard combat uniform color was olive green. The army then switched to all woodland camouflage and Desert Camouflage Uniform. In July 2008, the D.G.FA.V.E. announced plans for creating the country's first digital uniforms, which would consist of Woodland/jungle and Desert camouflage; these uniforms entered service in 2009.Granjas Militares (Military farms) – In charge of Agriculture; crop cultivation is a necessity to maintain the health and economy of the Army/Air Force. The Mexican Army has four established SEDENA farms:
Granja SEDENA number 1 (San Juan del Río, Querétaro).
Granja SEDENA number 2 (Ixtepec, Oaxaca).
Granja SEDENA number 3 (Sarabia, Guanajuato).
Granja SEDENA number 4 (La Fuente, Aguascalientes).

Equipment

Vehicles
thumb|right|250px|VCR-TT 6X6 APC on Madero Street in downtown Mexico City after Independence Day celebrations

 Infantry weapons 

Artillery

Anti-armor weapons

See also
 Mexican Navy
 Mexican Air Force

Further reading
Colonial era
Archer, Christon I. The Army in Bourbon Mexico, 1760–1810. Albuquerque: University of New Mexico Press 1977.
Archer, Christon I. "The Officer Corps in New Spain: the Martial Career, 1759–1821." Jahrbuch für Geschicte von Staat, Wirtschaft und Gesellschaft Lateinamerikas 19 (1982).
McAlister, Lyle. The "Fuero Militar" in New Spain, 1764–1800. Gainesville: University of Florida Press 1957.

Post-Independence
Camp, Roderic Ai. Generals in the Palacio: The Military in Modern Mexico. New York: Oxford University Press 1992.
Díaz Díaz, Fernando. Caudillos y caciques: Antonio López de Santa Anna y Juan Alvarez. Mexico City: El Colegio de México 1972.
Fowler, Will. Military Political Identity and Reformism in Independent Mexico: An Analysis of the Memorias de Guerra (1821–1855). London: Institute of Latin American Studies 1996.
Lieuwen, Edwin. Mexican Militarism: The Political Rise and Fall of the Revolutionary Army. Albuquerque: University of New Mexico Press 1968.
Neufeld, Stephen B. The Blood Contingent: The Military and the Making of Modern Mexico, 1876–1911. Albuquerque: University of New Mexico Press 2017.
Ronfeldt, David, editor. The Modern Mexican Military: A Reassessment. La Jolla: Center for U.S.-Mexican Studies, University of California San Diego 1984.
Serrano, Mónica. "The Armed Branch of the State: Civil-Military Relations in Mexico," Journal of Latin American Studies 27 (1995)
Vanderwood, Paul. Disorder and Progress: Bandits, Police, and Mexican Development. Lincoln: University of Nebraska Press 1981.
Wager, J. Stephen. The Mexican Military: Approaches to the 21st Century: Coping with a New World Order''. Carlisle PA: Strategic Studies Institute: U.S. Army War College 1994.

References

External links
 Photos of the Mexican Army, National Marine and Air Force
 Secretaria de la Defensa Nacional – Fabrica de armas y equipos
 Inventario 2006
 Mexican Army Photos
 Latin American Light Weapons National Inventories
 Military Territorial Division
 Mexican Army Oshkosh Sandcat

Mexico
Mexico
Mexican Air Force
Army